Georg II may refer to:

 George II, Duke of Pomerania (1582–1617)
 George II, Landgrave of Hesse-Darmstadt (1605–1661)
 Georg II, Duke of Saxe-Meiningen (1826–1914)